Apoplania penai is a species of moth belonging to the family Neopseustidae. It was described by Davis and Nielsen in 1980. It is known from Argentina, south to Esquel and Chile, south to Chiloé Island.

References

Neopseustidae
Moths of South America